Carl Nielsen's Helios Overture, Opus 17, is a concert overture which was first performed by the Royal Danish Orchestra, conducted by Johan Svendsen, on 8 October 1903 in the large hall of the Odd Fellows Mansion in Copenhagen.

Overview
Besides his well-known six symphonies, the Danish composer Carl Nielsen wrote many short orchestral works, one of the most famous being the Helios Overture. In 1902, Nielsen signed a contract with the publisher Wilhelm Hansen, which allowed him to go to Athens, Greece, to join his wife Anne Marie Carl-Nielsen, who was one of the first sculptors allowed to make copies of the bas-reliefs and statues in the Acropolis Museum.

Anne Marie, who had been granted the Ancker Award, was studying Greek art, while Nielsen, being a man of many interests, was interested in archaeology. The local conservatory placed a study room with a piano at Carl Nielsen's disposal. Here he could sit and compose when he was not on excursions in the surrounding mountains with or without Anne Marie.
Nielsen's stay in Athens gave him the inspiration of a work depicting the sun rising and setting over the Aegean Sea, an overture which he called Helios. He began work on it in March 1903, and finished it on April 23 the same year.

The score is written for three flutes, two oboes, two clarinets, two bassoons, four horns, three trumpets, three trombones, tuba, timpani, and strings.

The work begins as the sun ascends over the Aegean Sea, while strings, divided horns and woodwind sound a melody. This rises out of the darkness to a full orchestra, where fanfaring trumpets begin a striding theme, which returns later in the piece. From there woodwinds begin a graceful tune, from which brass sound.  Strings begin to play, which draws the orchestra into a reprise of the striding theme and its fanfare. In the final measures, the music subsides as the sun sinks over the horizon of the sea. The average playing time is between ten and twelve minutes.

On the score, Nielsen wrote:

 "Silence and darkness,
 The sun rises with a joyous song of praise,
 It wanders its golden way
 and sinks quietly into the sea."

After a trip to Turkey, Carl and Anne Marie Nielsen traveled through Italy and reached Copenhagen by the end of July. The Helios Overture was successfully performed in Copenhagen on 8 October 1903, with Johan Svendsen conducting, though the reviews were mixed. Carl Nielsen performed Helios several times. The first was an evening concert dedicated to his compositions at the Odd Fellow Mansion on 11 November 1905 and the last performance was on 12 February 1930 in Gothenburg, Sweden. He also played the overture in Helsinki, Stockholm and Berlin.

Being a great showpiece for orchestra, it has been one of Nielsen's most famous works ever since.

Performances today

On the basis of information from the Carl Nielsen Society, the Helios Overture is currently one of Nielsen's most widely performed works.

References

External links
Carl Nielsen Society

Compositions by Carl Nielsen
Concert overtures
1903 compositions